VetDepot is on online pet pharmacy founded in 2005 by Craig Gilmore, who also owns Gilmore & Co., Inc., a research and investment firm. Based in Encinitas, California, VetDepot sells pet medications, pet supplies, pet supplements, and other pet related products through the mail to all 50 U.S. states.

Background

In 2011, VetDepot was named to the list of Inc. 500 Fastest Growing Companies in America. In 2011 and 2012, VetDepot was named to the Inc. 5000 list. VetDepot is certified to be a reputable online pharmacy through LegitScript, the leading source of internet pharmacy verification.

Products

VetDepot offers both prescription and over-the-counter (OTC) products, including veterinary medications, nutritional supplements, vaccines, first aid products, grooming products, treats, pet food, toys, and other pet supplies. The company carries lines from dozens of manufacturers, including many of the best known brands in pet care.

Products are available for cats, dogs, fish, small pets, exotic pets, birds, horses, cattle, and other animals. VetDepot supplies directly to pet owners, veterinarians, animal shelters, and other customers.

The Pet Hero Program

VetDepot launched its Pet Hero program to support individuals and organizations promoting animal welfare. The program provides donations and affiliate marketing partnerships.

References

Online retailers of the United States
Online pharmacies
Veterinary companies of the United States
Internet properties established in 2005